Corynocarpus is the only genus of plants in the family Corynocarpaceae and includes five species. It is native to New Guinea, Australia, New Zealand, New Caledonia, and Vanuatu.

Species
 Corynocarpus cribbianus (F. M. Bailey) L. S. Sm. (syn C. australasicus) - New Guinea, Aru Islands, Queensland
 Corynocarpus dissimilis Hemsl. - New Caledonia
 Corynocarpus laevigatus J. R. Forst. & G. Forst. - New Zealand
 Corynocarpus rupestris Guymer  - Queensland, New South Wales
 Corynocarpus similis Hemsl. - Vanuatu

References

External links

https://web.archive.org/web/20110715092517/http://www.plantcare.com/encyclopedia/new-zealand-laurel-1260.aspx

Cucurbitales genera
Corynocarpaceae